Greigia columbiana is a plant species in the genus Greigia. This species is native to Costa Rica, Panama, Colombia, Ecuador, and Venezuela.

Two varieties are recognized:

Greigia columbiana var. columbiana - Costa Rica, Panama, Colombia, Venezuela
Greigia columbiana var. subinermis L.B.Sm. - Colombia, Ecuador

References

columbiana
Flora of Central America
Flora of South America
Plants described in 1932